The Grand Ole Opry is a weekly American country music stage concert in Nashville, Tennessee, founded on November 28, 1925, by George D. Hay as a one-hour radio "barn dance" on WSM. Currently owned and operated by Opry Entertainment (a division of Ryman Hospitality Properties, Inc.), it is the longest-running radio broadcast in U.S. history. Dedicated to honoring country music and its history, the Opry showcases a mix of famous singers and contemporary chart-toppers performing country, bluegrass, Americana, folk, and gospel music as well as comedic performances and skits. It attracts hundreds of thousands of visitors from around the world and millions of radio and internet listeners.

In the 1930s, the show began hiring professionals and expanded to four hours. Broadcasting by then at 50,000 watts, WSM made the program a Saturday night musical tradition in nearly 30 states. In 1939, it debuted nationally on NBC Radio. The Opry moved to a permanent home, the Ryman Auditorium, in 1943. As it developed in importance, so did the city of Nashville, which became America's "country music capital." The Grand Ole Opry holds such significance in Nashville that it is included as a "home of" mention on the welcome signs seen by motorists at the Metro Nashville/Davidson County line.

Membership in the Opry remains one of country music's crowning achievements. Since 1974, the show has been broadcast from the Grand Ole Opry House east of downtown Nashville, with an annual three-month winter foray back to the Ryman from 1999 to 2020. In addition to the radio programs, performances have been sporadically televised over the years. The Oprys television partner is currently Circle, a digital multicast network which is partially-owned by Opry Entertainment and Gray Television, and broadcasts portions of the live Saturday night performance on an irregular basis.
Dolly Parton recently celebrated 50 years of performing on The Grand Ole Opry.

History

Beginnings

The Grand Ole Opry started as the WSM Barn Dance in the new fifth-floor radio studio of the National Life & Accident Insurance Company in downtown Nashville on November 28, 1925. On October 17, 1925, management began a program featuring "Dr. Humphrey Bate and his string quartet of old-time musicians." On November 2, WSM hired long-time announcer and program director George D. Hay, an enterprising pioneer from the National Barn Dance program at WLS in Chicago, who was also named the most popular radio announcer in America as a result of his radio work with both WLS and WMC in Memphis, Tennessee. Hay launched the WSM Barn Dance with 77-year-old fiddler Uncle Jimmy Thompson on November 28, 1925, and that date is celebrated as the day the Grand Ole Opry began.

Some of the bands regularly on the show during its early days included Bill Monroe, the Possum Hunters (with Humphrey Bate), the Fruit Jar Drinkers with Uncle Dave Macon, the Crook Brothers, the Binkley Brothers' Dixie Clodhoppers, Sid Harkreader, DeFord Bailey, Fiddlin' Arthur Smith, and the Gully Jumpers.

Judge Hay liked the Fruit Jar Drinkers and asked them to appear last on each show because he wanted to always close each segment with "red hot fiddle playing". They were the second band accepted on Barn Dance, with the Crook Brothers being the first. When the Opry began having square dancers on the show, the Fruit Jar Drinkers always played for them. In 1926, Uncle Dave Macon, a Tennessee banjo player who had recorded several songs and toured on the vaudeville circuit, became its first real star.

Name
The phrase "Grand Ole Opry" was first uttered on radio on December 10, 1927. At the time, the NBC Red Network's Music Appreciation Hour, a program with classical music and selections from grand opera, was followed by Hay's Barn Dance. That evening, as he was introducing DeFord Bailey, the show's first performer of the night, George Hay said the following words:
For the past hour, we have been listening to music largely from Grand Opera, but from now on, we will present 'The Grand Ole Opry'.

Larger venues
As audiences for the live show increased, National Life & Accident Insurance's radio venue became too small to accommodate the hordes of fans. They built a larger studio, but it was still not large enough. After several months with no audiences, National Life decided to allow the show to move outside its home offices. In October 1934, the Opry moved into then-suburban Hillsboro Theatre (now the Belcourt) before moving to the Dixie Tabernacle in East Nashville on June 13, 1936. The Opry then moved to the War Memorial Auditorium, a downtown venue adjacent to the State Capitol, and a 25-cent admission fee was charged to try to curb the large crowds, but to no avail. In June 1943, the Opry moved to Ryman Auditorium.

One hour of the Opry was nationally broadcast by the NBC Red Network from 1939 to 1956, and for much of its run, it aired one hour after the program that had inspired it, National Barn Dance. The NBC segment, originally known by the name of its sponsor, The Prince Albert Show, was first hosted by Acuff, who was succeeded by Red Foley from 1946 to 1954. From October 15, 1955, to September 1956, ABC-TV aired a live, hour-long television version once a month on Saturday nights (sponsored by Ralston-Purina) that pre-empted one hour of the then-90-minute Ozark Jubilee. From 1955 to 1957, Al Gannaway owned and produced both The Country Show and Stars of the Grand Ole Opry, both filmed programs syndicated by Flamingo Films. Gannaway's Stars of the Grand Ole Opry was the first television show shot in color.

On October 2, 1954, a teenage Elvis Presley had his only Opry performance. Although the audience reacted politely to his revolutionary brand of rockabilly music, Opry manager Jim Denny told Presley's producer Sam Phillips after the show that the singer's style did not suit the program.

1960s
In the 1960s, as the hippie counterculture movement spread, the Opry maintained a strait-laced, conservative image with "longhairs" not being featured on the show. Artists were expected to dress conservatively, with women regularly wearing gingham country dresses; Jeannie Seely, upon joining the Opry in 1967, fought management to wear more contemporary attire such as miniskirts and go-go boots, arguing that if the Opry were going to have a dress code, it should enforce it upon the audience as well, and that she was only wearing what most young women of the time were wearing. Seely's actions effectively caused the fall of a "gingham curtain". Despite her disputes with the dress code, Seely would remain loyal to the Opry, setting the record for most appearances on the program over 55 years (and ongoing) as a member.

The Byrds were a notable exception. Country rock pioneer Gram Parsons, who was a member of The Byrds at the time, was in Nashville to work on the band's country rock album, Sweetheart of the Rodeo. The band's record label, Columbia Records, had arranged for The Byrds to perform at the Ryman on March 15, 1968, a prospect that thrilled Parsons. However, when the band took the stage the audience's response was immediately hostile, resulting in derisive heckling, booing, and mocking calls of "tweet, tweet" and "cut your hair" The Byrds further outraged the Opry establishment by ignoring accepted protocol when they performed Parsons' song "Hickory Wind" instead of the Merle Haggard song "Life in Prison", as had been announced by Tompall Glaser. Two decades later, long after Parsons's death, members of The Byrds reconciled with the Opry and collaborated on the 1989 album Will the Circle Be Unbroken: Volume Two.

Another artist that ran afoul of the Oprys stringent standards was Jerry Lee Lewis, who made his first and only appearance on the show on January 20, 1973, after several years of success on the country charts. Lewis was given two conditions for his appearance – no rock and roll and no profanity – and he proceeded to disregard both, even referring to himself as a certain unairable maternal insult at one point. In a continuous 40-minute set, Lewis played a mixture of his rock and roll hits and covers of other singers' country songs. It has been said that he was bitter about how he was treated when he first arrived in Nashville in 1955, and he supposedly used his Opry appearance to exact revenge on the Nashville music industry.

Country legend Johnny Cash, who made his Opry debut on July 5, 1956, and met his future wife June Carter Cash on that day, was banned from the program in 1965 after, drunkenly, smashing the stage lights with the microphone stand. Cash commented on the incident years later: "I don't know how much they wanted me in the first place," he says, "but the night I broke all the stage lights with the microphone stand, they said they couldn't use me anymore. So I went out and used it as an excuse to really get wild and ended up in the hospital the third time I broke my nose." Cash was accepted back in 1968, after the success of his At Folsom Prison album and his recovery from addiction.

Grand Ole Opry House

Ryman Auditorium was home to the Opry until 1974. By the late 1960s, National Life & Accident desired a new, larger, more modern home for the long-running radio show. Already 51 years old at the time the Opry moved there, the Ryman was beginning to suffer from disrepair as the downtown neighborhood around it fell victim to increasing urban decay. Despite these shortcomings, the show's popularity continued to increase, and its weekly crowds were outgrowing the 2,362-seat venue. The Opry's operators wanted to build a new air-conditioned theater, with greater seating capacity, ample parking, and the ability to serve as a television production facility. The ideal location would be in a less urbanized part of town to provide visitors with a safer, more controlled, and more enjoyable experience.

National Life & Accident purchased farmland owned by a local sausage manufacturer (Rudy's Farm) in the Pennington Bend area of Nashville, nine miles east of downtown and adjacent to the newly constructed Briley Parkway. The new Opry venue was the centerpiece of a grand entertainment complex at that location, which later included Opryland USA Theme Park and Opryland Hotel. The theme park opened to the public on June 30, 1972, well ahead of the 4,000-seat Opry House, which debuted nearly two years later, on Saturday, March 16, 1974. The last show of the Grand Ole Opry at the Ryman Auditorium was held on March 15, 1974.

Opening night was attended by sitting U.S. President Richard Nixon, who played a few songs on the piano. To carry on the tradition of the show's run at the Ryman, a six-foot circle of oak was cut from the corner of the Ryman's stage and inlaid into center stage at the new venue. Artists on stage usually stood on the circle as they performed, and most modern performers still follow this tradition.

The theme park was closed and demolished following the 1997 season, but the Grand Ole Opry House remains in use. The immediate area around it was left intact, even throughout the construction of Opry Mills, which opened in May 2000. The outside was decorated with the commemorative plaques of country music Grammy winners, formerly of Opryland's StarWalk, until the display was retired, reconfigured, and moved downtown to become the Music City Walk of Fame in 2006.

The Grand Ole Opry continues to be performed every Tuesday, Friday, Saturday, and occasionally Wednesday and Sunday at the Grand Ole Opry House. The site was added to the National Register of Historic Places on January 27, 2015.

The Grand Ole Opry House was also the home of the Country Music Association Awards from 1974 to 2004, and hosted three weeks of tapings for the long-running game show Wheel of Fortune in 2003. The venue has also been the site of the GMA Dove Awards on multiple occasions.

On December 21, 2018, the backstage band room was officially named the Jimmy Capps Music Room in honor of Capps's 60th anniversary on the Opry.

Return to Ryman Auditorium 
Following the departure of the Opry, Ryman Auditorium sat mostly vacant and decaying for 20 years. An initial effort by National Life & Accident to tear down the Ryman and use its bricks to build a chapel at Opryland USA was met with resounding resistance from the public, including many influential musicians of the time. The plans were abandoned, and the building remained standing with an uncertain future. Despite the absence of performances, the building remained a tourist attraction throughout the remainder of the 1970s and 1980s.

In 1991 and 1992, Emmylou Harris performed a series of concerts there and released some of the recordings as an album entitled At the Ryman. The concert and album's high acclaim renewed interest in reviving Ryman Auditorium as an active venue. Beginning in September 1993, Gaylord Entertainment initiated a full renovation of the Ryman, restoring it to a world-class concert hall that reopened with a broadcast of A Prairie Home Companion on June 4, 1994.

On Sunday, October 18, 1998, the Opry held a benefit show at Ryman Auditorium, marking its return to the venue for the first time since its final show on March 15, 1974.

Beginning in November 1999, the Opry was held at Ryman Auditorium for three months, partly due to the ongoing construction of Opry Mills. The Opry returned to the Ryman for the three winter months every year until 2019-20, allowing the show to acknowledge its roots while also taking advantage of a smaller venue during an off-peak season for tourism. While still officially the Grand Ole Opry, the shows there are billed as Opry at the Ryman. From 2002 to 2014, a traveling version of the Radio City Christmas Spectacular took up residence at the Grand Ole Opry House each holiday season while the Opry was away. It was replaced by Dr. Seuss' How the Grinch Stole Christmas! The Musical from 2015 in 2017 and by Cirque Dreams Holidaze in 2018.

2010 flooding
In May 2010, the Opry House was flooded, along with much of Nashville, when the Cumberland River overflowed its banks. Repairs were made, and the Opry itself remained uninterrupted. Over the course of the summer of 2010, the broadcast temporarily originated from alternate venues in Nashville, with Ryman Auditorium hosting the majority of the shows. Other venues included TPAC War Memorial Auditorium, another former Opry home; TPAC's Andrew Jackson Hall; Nashville Municipal Auditorium; Allen Arena at Lipscomb University; and Two Rivers Baptist Church.

Much of the auditorium's main floor seating, the backstage areas, and the entire stage – including the inlaid circle of wood from Ryman's stage – was underwater during the flood. While the Grand Ole Opry House's stage was replaced, the Ryman circle was restored and again placed at center stage in the Grand Ole Opry House before shows resumed. The renovations following the flood also resulted in an updated and much-expanded backstage area, including the construction of more dressing rooms and a performer's lounge.

The Opry returned to the Grand Ole Opry House on September 28, 2010, in a special edition of the Opry entitled Country Comes Home that was televised live on Great American Country. The evening was filled with one-of-a-kind Opry moments. Martina McBride and Connie Smith sang Smith's signature hit "Once a Day" together, and other collaborations included Dierks Bentley and Del McCoury ("Roll On Buddy, Roll On"), Josh Turner and Lorrie Morgan ("Golden Ring"), and Montgomery Gentry and Charlie Daniels Band ("Devil Went Down to Georgia"), among others. The show closed with an all-star guitar jam featuring Brad Paisley, Keith Urban, Steve Wariner, Ricky Skaggs, and Marty Stuart.

COVID-19 pandemic response
The Opry closed its doors to spectators and trimmed its staff in March 2020 as a result of the COVID-19 pandemic in Tennessee but continued to air weekly episodes on radio and television, relying on advertising revenue to remain solvent. The Opry resumed allowing spectators on a limited basis in October, and resumed full operations in May 2021. Due to the restrictions, the show did not move to the Ryman Auditorium in November 2020 as was customary. The Winter Ryman residency did not resume in 2021-22, partly due to scheduling conflicts from Ryman concerts postponed during the pandemic closure.

The Opry livestreams were celebrated by viewers as something to look forward to during the pandemic, with the majority of viewers being under lockdown. According to Pollstar, Opry Live was the number one most-watched livestream series in 2020 across all genres and received more than fifty million viewers from over fifty countries throughout the year, with two individual episodes (Vince Gill/Reba McEntire and Brad Paisley/Carrie Underwood) placing at numbers nine and ten respectively in the top ten. President of Opry Entertainment Scott Bailey explained that "as the stewards of the Grand Ole Opry, it was never a question of if the Opry would play on, but how could it provide a safe and much-needed source of comfort during what has been an extraordinary year around the world. We are proud of this tremendous result and the numbers of viewers who have tuned in, not only for what it has meant for Circle, but also for what it says about the country music genre and country music fans. On behalf of all of us at the Grand Ole Opry and Opry Entertainment, I'd like to thank the artist community, industry and music lovers around the world for their continued support".

Broadcasts

The Grand Ole Opry is broadcast live on WSM-AM at 7 p.m. CT on Saturday nights, changed from a previous time start of 6:30. A similar program, Friday Night Opry, airs live on Friday nights. From February through December, Tuesday Night Opry is also aired live. Wednesday shows are typically presented in the summer months, while an "Opry Country Classics" program sporadically airs on Thursdays, devoted solely to older artists. Additional Christmas-themed shows, entitled Opry Country Christmas, began production during the 2021 holiday season.

The Opry provides a fourteen-piece house band for performers should they not have a band of their own.

The Opry can also be heard live on Willie's Roadhouse on channel 59 on Sirius XM Satellite Radio, and the program streams on WSM's website. ABC broadcast the Grand Ole Opry as a monthly series from 1955 to 1956, and PBS televised annual live performances from 1978 to 1981. In 1985, The Nashville Network, co-owned by Gaylord, began airing an edited half-hour version of the program as Grand Ole Opry Live. The show moved to Country Music Television, also owned by Gaylord, where it expanded to an hour, and then to the Great American Country (GAC) cable network, which no longer televised its Opry Live show after both networks channel drifted towards generic Southern lifestyle programming. Circle, a new over-the-air digital subchannel network operated by Gray Television and Ryman Hospitality Properties, resumed telecasting the Opry as its flagship program when it launched in 2020, and former WSM radio sister station WSMV-DT5 is the network's flagship station. Initially simulcasting the radio version, since 2021, the television Opry Live has been pre-recorded live to tape telecasts of recent Opry shows (the show's time slot often coincides with intermission and less demographic-friendly radio segments such as square dancing and audience participation bits). RFD-TV carries reruns of Opry telecasts under the title Opry Encore.

Membership

Regular performers at the Grand Ole Opry can be inducted into the organization as a member. Opry management, when it decides to induct a new member, directs an existing member to publicly ask them to join, usually during a live episode; an induction ceremony happens several weeks later, where the inductee is presented with a trophy and gives an acceptance speech. As the Opry is a running series, membership in the show's cast must be maintained throughout an artist's career, through frequent performances, and expires when the performer dies. Duos and groups remain members until all members have died; following the death of a member, the others maintain Opry membership. More recent protocols have allowed performers who are incapacitated or retired (such as Barbara Mandrell, Jeanne Pruett, Ray Pillow, Stu Phillips and Ricky Van Shelton) to maintain Opry membership until they die. Randy Travis has maintained his Opry membership largely through non-singing appearances since his 2013 stroke (Loretta Lynn was granted similar accommodation from 2017 until her 2022 death). The Opry maintains a wall of fame listing every member of the Opry in the show's history, including those that have died or lost/relinquished their membership. Receiving Opry membership is considered an honor that is similar in prestige to a hall of fame induction, with the caveat that a number of prominent country musicians never received it. The most recent induction took place on August 30, 2022, when Don Schlitz became the first-ever member of the Opry inducted for his songwriting and not as a performer (having begun regular appearances after Travis's incapacitation, performing songs he had written for Travis and the late Kenny Rogers, who was never an Opry member). With his induction, and the death of Loretta Lynn on October 4, there are 69 living members. Ashley McBryde is a member-in-waiting, after accepting an invitation on October 6, 2022, from Garth Brooks.

Controversies
In April 1963, Opry management mandated that members had to perform no less than 26 shows a year in order to maintain their membership. WSM decreased the number of those required performances to 20 in January 1964, and the minimum number was 12 in 2000. Although the minimum number of performances has been reduced over the years, artists offered membership are expected to display their dedication to the Opry with frequent attendance.

Another controversy raged for years over permissible instrumentation, especially the use of drums and electrically amplified instruments. Some purists were appalled at the prospect; traditionally, a string bass provided the rhythm component in country music, and percussion instruments were seldom used. Electric amplification, new in the beginning days of the Opry, was regarded as the province of popular music and jazz in the 1940s. Although the Opry allowed electric guitars and steel guitars by World War II, the restrictions against drums and horns continued, causing a conflict when Bob Wills and Pee Wee King defied the show's ban on drums. Wills openly flouted the rule. King, who performed at the Ryman in 1945 after Franklin Delano Roosevelt's death, did not technically defy the ban. He did not use his drums on the Opry, but this particular Saturday night, the Opry was cancelled due to FDR's death. He and his band were asked to perform their theater show (with their drummer) because a number of fans showed up assuming the Opry would go on. It took years after that before drums became commonly accepted at the Opry; as late as 1967, an item in Billboard claimed that "[a] full set of drums was used on the 'Grand Ole Opry' for the first time in history when Jerry Reed performed last week. Jerry's drummer, Willie Akerman, was allowed to use the entire set during his guest performance there."

Stonewall Jackson, an Opry member since 1956, sued the Opry management in 2007 alleging that manager Pete Fisher was trying to purge older members of the Opry from its membership and committing age discrimination. Jackson settled the lawsuit in 2008 and resumed appearing on the program until retiring in 2012.

In early 2022, Morgan Wallen performed on the Grand Ole Opry alongside Ernest. This move was criticized by many country music fans, as Wallen had been taped less than a year prior shouting a racial slur, and the Opry had previously made stances against racism on social media. In response to the latter, music writer Holly G. founded the Black Opry as a means of raising awareness of black artists in country music.

Commercialization

The company has enforced its trademark on the name "Grand Ole Opry," with trademark registrations in the United States and in numerous countries around the world. It has taken court action to limit use of the word "Opry" – not directly trademarked – to members of the Opry and products associated with or licensed by it and to discourage use of the word in ways that would imply a connection to the Grand Ole Opry. In late 1968, for instance, WSM sued Opry Records, a record label that was independent of WSM, and the court decided that "the record is replete with newspaper and magazine articles and clippings which demonstrate conclusively that the term 'Opry,' standing alone as defendant has used it, is constantly used in country and western music circles in referring to plaintiff's 'Grand Ole Opry'." The court also stated "the defendant has appropriated, at its peril, the dominant or salient term in the plaintiff's mark, a term which identified the 'Grand Ole Opry' in the mind of the public many years before the inception of 'Opry Records' – the name adopted by defendant."

In another case, the Trademark Trial and Appeal Board granted summary judgment that the term "Opry" is a generic term (and thus no more protected than the words "Grand" or "Ole"), but the Federal Circuit court reversed this decision. As recently as 2009, the Trademark Trial and Appeal Board granted judgment against Texas Opry House, LLC, which had filed a trademark application for TEXAS OPRY HOUSE.

In 2004, the Grand Ole Opry sold naming rights to its first "presenting sponsor," Cracker Barrel. As of 2021, the Opry is sponsored by insurer Humana and retail chain Dollar General.

Honors
 Peabody Award, 1983
 National Radio Hall of Fame induction, 1992

See also

 Country Music Association
 Country Music Hall of Fame and Museum
 Music & the Spoken Word - "The longest-running continuous network radio program in the world" (began July 15, 1929).

Notes

References
 Hay, George D. A Story of the Grand Ole Opry. 1945.
 Kingsbury, Paul (1998). "Grand Ole Opry". In The Encyclopedia of Country Music. Paul Kingsbury, Editor. New York: Oxford University Press. pp. 208–9.
 Wolfe, Charles K. A Good-Natured Riot: The Birth of the Grand Ole Opry. Nashville: Country Music Foundation Press, 1999. .

External links

 
 Grand Ole Opry on TV Internet Archive Complete show of April 28, 1956, in black & white 
 Library of Congress Local Legacies Project: Grand Ole Opry

 
Concerts in the United States
1920s American radio programs
1925 radio programme debuts
American country music radio programs
Country music television series
Culture of Nashville, Tennessee
Ryman Hospitality Properties
History of Tennessee
Landmarks in Tennessee
Peabody Award winners
Sirius XM Radio programs
Television series based on radio series
Tennessee culture
United States National Recording Registry recordings
Tourist attractions in Nashville, Tennessee
Organizations based in Nashville, Tennessee
1925 establishments in Tennessee
Theatres on the National Register of Historic Places in Tennessee
NBC radio programs
National Register of Historic Places in Nashville, Tennessee